Christopher Hitchens (13 April 1949 – 15 December 2011) was a British-American author, polemicist, debater and journalist who in his youth took part in demonstrations against the Vietnam War, joined organisations such as the International Socialists while at university and began to identify as a socialist. However, after the 11 September attacks he no longer regarded himself as a socialist and his political thinking became largely dominated by the issue of defending civilization from terrorists and against the totalitarian regimes that protect them. Hitchens nonetheless continued to identify as a Marxist, endorsing the materialist conception of history, but believed that Karl Marx had underestimated the revolutionary nature of capitalism. He sympathized with libertarian ideals of limited state interference, but considered libertarianism not to be a viable system. In the 2000 U.S. presidential election, he supported the Green Party candidate Ralph Nader. After 9/11, Hitchens advocated the invasion of Iraq. In the 2004 election, he very slightly favored the incumbent Republican President George W. Bush or was neutral and in 2008 he favored the Democratic candidate Barack Obama over John McCain despite being critical of both of them.

Political orientation

First principles
Alexander Linklater has summarized Hitchens' basic intellectual outlook as follows:

British republicanism
Hitchens was a vocal supporter of republicanism in the United Kingdom, advocating the abolition of the monarchy, and in 1990 published the book-long polemic The Monarchy: A Critique of Britain's Favourite Fetish. His 1998 documentary Princess Diana: The Mourning After accused the British media of playing an essential role in creating a national, unchallengeable, and at times hysterical cult of personality surrounding the death of Diana, Princess of Wales, whereas previously they had been extremely critical of her and the monarchy after she had separated and divorced from Charles, Prince of Wales, and was having an affair with Egyptian billionaire Dodi Fayed. Hitchens claimed the public were behaving irrationally, and that many appeared to not even know why they were mourning. He also scrutinised the level of censorship against criticism of Diana and the monarchy but was accused, in a review by The Independent, of exaggerating on this point.

Labour Party
In 1965, Hitchens joined the Labour Party on the very first day he was eligible to vote, but along with the majority of the Labour students' organization was expelled in 1967, because of what Hitchens called "Prime Minister Harold Wilson's contemptible support for the war in Vietnam". Since then he stated he had "re-enlisted a few times" back into the Labour Party. In a 2001 interview with Reason, he said that, in 1979, despite being a member of the Labour Party, he wasn't going to vote for them, nor could he bring himself to "vote Conservative." He abstained from voting. Hitchens stated that by not voting for the Labour Party he was effectively voting for Margaret Thatcher to win, which he said he had "secretly hoped would happen." In a 2005 Vanity Fair article, he endorsed Tony Blair in the 2005 general election, mainly due to his support for the 2003 invasion of Iraq. In a 2009 Slate article, he described that in the late 1970s the Labour Party moved to the right and stated that the downfall of the Labour Party came about upon Gordon Brown's becoming Prime Minister.

European Union
Hitchens was a supporter of the European Union. In an appearance on C-SPAN in 1993, Hitchens said, "As of 1992, there is a now a Euro passport that makes you free to travel within the boundaries of... member countries, and I've always liked the idea of European unity, and so I held out for a Euro passport. So I travel as a European."

Speaking at the launch of his brother Peter Hitchens' book, The Abolition of Britain at Conway Hall in London, Hitchens denounced the so-called Eurosceptic movement, describing it as "the British version of fascism". He went on to say, "Scepticism is a title of honour. These people are not sceptical. They're fanatical. They're dogmatic".

Northern Ireland
During a debate with George Galloway in 2005, Hitchens revealed that he was "a lifelong supporter of the reunification of Ireland". Many times, when discussing "the Troubles" in Northern Ireland, Hitchens would refer to their location as simply "Ireland", rather than "Northern Ireland", as for example in an article written for Slate in 2007, discussing the power-sharing and devolved government in Northern Ireland and describing it as "an agreement to divide the spoils of Ireland's six northeastern counties". During the IRA bombing campaigns on Great Britain, which began in the nineteen-seventies, Hitchens claimed that he had "kept two sets of books: I didn't like bombs, I didn't like the partition of Ireland."

Libertarianism and capitalism
In a 2001 interview with Reason, Hitchens said he had been interested in libertarian ideas when he was younger, but set aside those interests in the 1960s. He stated that capitalism had become the more revolutionary economic system, and he welcomed globalisation as "innovative and internationalist", but added, "I don't think that the contradictions, as we used to say, of the system, are by any means all resolved." He also stated that he had a renewed interest in the freedom of the individual from the state, but that he still considered libertarianism "ahistorical" both on the world stage and in the work of creating a stable and functional society, adding that libertarians are "more worried about the over-mighty state than the unaccountable corporation" whereas "the present state of affairs ... combines the worst of bureaucracy with the worst of the insurance companies." He also said that libertarians did not have a clear foreign policy stance.

In a 2001 C-SPAN appearance, he told a caller:

In a 1986 video debate on Socialism vs Capitalism with John Judis VS Harry Binswanger and John Ridpath, Hitchens said:

Objectivism 
Hitchens said of Objectivism, "I have always found it quaint, and rather touching, that there is a movement in the US that thinks Americans are not yet selfish enough".

Marxism and socialism
In a 2001 interview with Reason, Hitchens said he became a Marxist and a Trotskyist in his teens, beliefs that further developed during his time at Balliol College, Oxford. In 1966, he was demonstrating in Trafalgar Square against the Vietnam War. In 1967, he joined the International Socialists while at Balliol College, Oxford. Under the influence of Peter Sedgwick, who translated the writings of Russian revolutionary and Soviet dissident Victor Serge, Hitchens forged an ideological interest in Trotskyist and anti-Stalinist socialism. Shortly after he joined "a small but growing post-Trotskyist Luxemburgist sect". This organisation is now known as the Alliance for Workers' Liberty. He became a socialist "largely [as] the outcome of a study of history, taking sides ... in the battles over industrialism and war and empire." He was also drawn into the political left by his anger over the Vietnam War, nuclear weapons, racism and "oligarchy", including that of "the unaccountable corporation." He also said in the same interview with Reason that he could no longer say "I am a socialist". Socialists, he claimed, had ceased to offer a positive alternative to the capitalist system.

In 2006, in a town hall meeting in Pennsylvania debating the Jewish Tradition with Martin Amis, Hitchens commented on his political philosophy by stating, "I am no longer a socialist, but I still am a Marxist". In a June 2010 interview with The New York Times, he stated that "I still think like a Marxist in many ways. I think the materialist conception of history is valid. I consider myself a very conservative Marxist". In 2009, in an article for The Atlantic entitled "The Revenge of Karl Marx", Hitchens frames the late-2000s recession in terms of Marx's economic analysis and notes how much Marx admired the capitalist system that he called for the end of, but says that Marx ultimately failed to grasp how revolutionary capitalist innovation was. Hitchens was an admirer of Che Guevara, yet in an essay written in 1997, he distanced himself from Che, and referred to the mythos surrounding him as a "cult". In 2004 he re-emphasized his positive view of Che, commenting that "[Che's] death meant a lot to me and countless like me at the time. He was a role model, albeit an impossible one for us bourgeois romantics insofar as he went and did what revolutionaries were meant to do – fought and died for his beliefs."

He continued to regard Leon Trotsky and Vladimir Lenin as great men, and the October Revolution as a necessary event in the modernisation of Russia. In 2005, Hitchens praised Lenin's creation of "secular Russia" and his attacks on the Russian Orthodox Church, describing the church's power as "absolute warren of backwardness and evil and superstition".

In God is not Great, Hitchens called Marxism his "own secular faith" that "has been shaken and discarded, not without pain." He referred to his period of Marxist faith as "when I was a Marxist."

According to Andrew Sullivan, his last words were "Capitalism, downfall."

Views on American presidents

Bill Clinton
Hitchens became increasingly disenchanted by the presidency of Bill Clinton, accusing him of being a rapist, a liar, and war criminal. Hitchens also described Clinton as a “a really arrogant, contemptible, dishonest president”. Hitchens said the missile attacks by Clinton on Sudan constituted a war crime. Hitchens criticized Clinton for his pardon of Marc Rich and others who had donated to Clinton, over seeing the execution of Ricky Ray Rector, his relationships with Monica Lewinsky and Gennifer Flowers.

George W. Bush

Hitchens supported Ralph Nader in the 2000 US presidential election. He elaborated on his support for Nader in a discussion with Eric Alterman on Bloggingheads.tv, indicating that he was disenchanted with the candidacy of both George W. Bush and Al Gore.

Prior to the September 11 attacks in 2001, and the invasion of Iraq and Afghanistan, Hitchens was critical of President George W. Bush's "non-interventionist" foreign policy. He also criticised Bush's support for intelligent design and capital punishment. Hitchens defended Bush's post-11 September foreign policy, but he also criticised the actions of US troops in Abu Ghraib and Haditha, and the US government's use of waterboarding, which, after voluntarily undergoing it, he argued was definitely torture. After Dick Cheney chief of staff Scooter Libby was found guilty of obstruction of justice and perjury, Hitchens defended Libby and called on Bush to pardon him.

Hitchens supported George W. Bush in the 2004 US presidential election. He made a brief return to The Nation just before the election and wrote that he was "slightly" for Bush; shortly afterwards, Slate polled its staff on their positions on the candidates and mistakenly printed Hitchens' vote as pro-John Kerry. Hitchens shifted his opinion to "neutral", saying: "It's absurd for liberals to talk as if Kristallnacht is impending with Bush, and it's unwise and indecent for Republicans to equate Kerry with capitulation. There's no one to whom he can surrender, is there? I think that the nature of the jihadist enemy will decide things in the end".

Barack Obama
Hitchens supported Barack Obama in the 2008 presidential election. Hitchens criticized Obamas democratic opponent Hillary Clinton writing in a column for the slate “Indifferent to truth, willing to use police-state tactics and vulgar libels against inconvenient witnesses, hopeless on health care and flippant and fast and loose with national security: the case against Hillary Clinton for president is open-and-shut”. In an article for Slate he stated, "I used to call myself a single-issue voter on the essential question of defending civilization against its terrorist enemies and their totalitarian protectors, and on that 'issue' I hope I can continue to expose and oppose any ambiguity." He was critical of both main party candidates, Obama and John McCain, but wrote that Obama would be the better choice. Hitchens went on to call McCain "senile", and his choice of running mate Sarah Palin "absurd", calling Palin a "pathological liar" and a "national disgrace". Hitchens also wrote that "Obama is greatly overrated" and that the Obama-Biden ticket "show[s] some signs of being able and willing to profit from experience".

Donald Trump
In 1999, Hitchens wrote a profile of future president Donald Trump for The Sunday Herald. Trump had expressed interest in running in the 2000 presidential election as a candidate for the Reform Party. Of Trump, Hitchens said, "Because the man with many monikers in many ways embodies his country and because this election cycle is now so absurd, and so much up for grabs, it is unwise to exclude anything... The best guess has to be that here's a man who hates to be alone, who needs approval and reinforcement, who talks a better game than he plays, who is crude, hyperactive, emotional and optimistic." Hitchens had previously written that Trump demonstrated "nobody is more covetous and greedy than those who have far too much."

The American Revolution
After his disenchantment with socialism, Hitchens increasingly emphasized the centrality of the American Revolution and the U.S. Constitution to his political philosophy. As early as 2002, Hitchens wrote, "as the third millennium gets under way, and as the Russian and Chinese and Cuban revolutions drop below the horizon, it is possible to argue that the American revolution, with its promise of cosmopolitan democracy, is the only 'model' revolution that humanity has left to it". His enthusiasm for the U.S. Bill of Rights contrasts with a dim opinion of constitutional politics on the other side of the Atlantic. Hitchens notes, "the utter failure [of the EU] to compose a viable constitution" and the "brevity of the British constitution, perhaps because the motherland of the English-speaking peoples has absent-mindedly failed to evolve one in written form".

Columbus Day

Historian David Stannard interpreted an essay by Hitchens: as follows:

Foreign policy

Bosnian War
Hitchens cited the Bosnian War as monumentally changing his views on military intervention, commenting that for the first time he found himself on the side of neoconservatives. In an interview with Johann Hari he said:

Hitchens argued that the choice in Yugoslavia was between a multi-ethnic plural democracy led by Muslim president Alija Izetbegović in Bosnia and a fascistic, nationalistically inspired ethnically cleansed state driven by Serbian leader Slobodan Milošević. He called Milošević a fascist and a "national-socialist", and condemned his war crimes in the Yugoslav Wars.  In God Is Not Great, he wrote about Christian Orthodox Serbian and Roman Catholic Croatian nationalism- and religion-inspired crimes against the Muslim Bosnians, at the hands of proponents of Serbian Chetnik revivalism, those in support of Croatian Ustashe revivalism and those for a Greater Serbia, during this period which are "often forgotten".

Kosovo War
Hitchens heavily supported western military intervention in Kosovo. He deplored Slobodan Milosevic's regime since the beginning of the Yugoslav Wars and the atrocities committed in Bosnia and later in Kosovo. Hitchens saw Milosevic and his nationalism as the prime catalyst for the break-up of Yugoslavia. He also highlighted the hypocrisy of Milosevic's regime in their concern about the Serb minorities in Croatia and Bosnia while at the same time suppressing autonomy for the 90% of Albanians in Kosovo.

After the war, Hitchens supported Kosovo's independence and criticized the burning of the US Embassy in Belgrade as a response to it:

Gulf War
Hitchens deplored and opposed the 1990–91 Gulf War in which the US expelled Iraq from Kuwait after a seven-month invasion and occupation of its neighbor undertaken in an effort to absorb it as its 19th province. He contended that President George H. W. Bush's supposedly principled enthusiasm for the "cause" of "liberating" Kuwait was nothing more than realpolitik. In the continuation of a national policy dating back to Henry Kissinger and Richard Nixon in 1972, the latest "cause was yet another move in the policy of keeping a region divided and embittered, and therefore accessible to the franchisers of weaponry and the owners of black gold".

However, after the war, Hitchens scolded those within the US who had opposed the war by observing that "the peace movement in this country in my opinion acted in a very narrow, isolationist, and almost chauvinistic way. It said that a war was more or less alright with it as long as it could be guaranteed in advance that American casualties could be kept low... I thought that was a dishonourably narrow way of approaching the question. ... When large numbers of Iraqis were turned into soap...and many others, as we've since found out, were bulldozed and buried alive and in other ways done away with and people don't even want to think about the body count ...because they're afraid of what they might find out."

Israeli−Palestinian conflict

Hitchens described Zionism as "an ethno-nationalist quasi-religious ideology" but argued that Zionism "nonetheless has founded a sort of democratic state which isn't any worse in its practice than many others with equally dubious origins." He stated that Israeli settlements on Palestinian territory in order to achieve security for Israel is "doomed to fail in the worst possible way", and the cessation of this "appallingly racist and messianic delusion" would "confront the internal clerical and chauvinist forces which want to instate a theocracy for Jews". Hitchens contended that the "solution of withdrawal would not satisfy the jihadists" and wondered "What did they imagine would be the response of the followers of the Prophet [Muhammad]?" Hitchens bemoaned the transference of Arab secularism into religious terrorism as a means of democratisation: "the most depressing and wretched spectacle of the past decade, for all those who care about democracy and secularism, has been the degeneration of Palestinian Arab nationalism into the theocratic and thanatocratic hell of Hamas and Islamic Jihad".

On 14 November 2004, Hitchens noted:

Hitchens had previously collaborated on this issue with Edward Said, publishing the 1988 book Blaming the Victims: Spurious Scholarship and the Palestinian Question.

Hitchens had said of himself, "I am an Anti-Zionist. I'm one of those people of Jewish descent who believes that Zionism would be a mistake even if there were no Palestinians."

A review of his autobiography Hitch-22 in The Jewish Daily Forward refers to Hitchens "at the time [that he had learned that his grandparents were Jews, he had been] a prominent anti-Zionist" and says that he viewed Zionism "as an injustice against the Palestinians". Others have commented on his anti-Zionism as well. At other times - for example, speaking at 2nd annual Memorial for Daniel Pearl, and in print in an article for The Atlantic - he had made comments against the terrorism against Jews in the Middle East. Hitchens stated "But the Jews of the Arab lands were expelled again in revenge for the defeat of Palestinian nationalistic aspirations, in 1947–48, and now the absolute most evil and discredited fabrication of Jew-baiting Christian Europe – The Protocols of the Elders of Zion – is eagerly promulgated in the Hamas charter and on the group's Web site and recycled through a whole nexus of outlets that includes schools as well as state-run television stations".

In Slate magazine, Hitchens pondered the notion that, instead of curing antisemitism through the creation of a Jewish state, "Zionism has only replaced and repositioned" it, saying: "there are three groups of 6 million Jews. The first 6 million live in what the Zionist movement used to call Palestine. The second 6 million live in the United States. The third 6 million are distributed mainly among Russia, France, Britain, and Argentina. Only the first group lives daily in range of missiles that can be (and are) launched by people who hate Jews." Hitchens argued that instead of supporting Zionism, Jews should help "secularise and reform their own societies", believing that unless one is religious, "what the hell are you doing in the greater Jerusalem area in the first place?" Indeed, Hitchens claimed that the only justification for Zionism given by Jews is a religious one.

Kurdistan
Hitchens was a longtime observer of Saddam Hussein's regime, and publicly called for his removal, albeit only beginning in 1998. This led him to support the establishment of a self-governing state for the Kurds with political autonomy, if not full independence.

He also wore a lapel pin with the flag of Kurdistan on it, to show his solidarity with the Kurds.

War on terror

11 September attacks

In the months following the 9/11 attacks, Hitchens and Noam Chomsky debated the nature of radical Islam and the proper response to it in a highly charged exchange of letters in The Nation, including discussion of whether any comparison could be legitimately made between the 9/11 attacks and the 1998 Al Shifa bombing by the U.S. Approximately a year after the 9/11 attacks and his exchanges with Chomsky, Hitchens left The Nation, claiming that its editors, readers and contributors considered John Ashcroft a bigger threat than Osama bin Laden, and were making excuses on behalf of Islamist terrorism; in the following months he wrote articles increasingly at odds with his former colleagues.

War in Afghanistan

Hitchens strongly supported US military actions in Afghanistan, particularly in his "Fighting Words" columns in Slate.

Iraq War
Hitchens employed the term "Islamofascist" and supported the Iraq War, causing his critics to consider him a "neoconservative". Hitchens, however, refused to embrace this designation, insisting, "I'm not any kind of conservative". In 2004, Hitchens stated that neoconservative support for US intervention in Iraq convinced him that he was "on the same side as the neo-conservatives" when it came to contemporary foreign policy issues, and characterized himself as an unqualified "supporter of Paul Wolfowitz." He referred to his associations as "temporary neocon allies". In this period he opined that "the Bush administration [...] has redefined the lazy term 'conservative' to mean someone who is impatient with the status quo."

In the years after the fatwa issued against Salman Rushdie in response to his novel The Satanic Verses, Hitchens became increasingly critical of what he called "excuse making" on the left. At the same time, he was attracted to the foreign policy ideas of some on the Republican-right that promoted pro-liberalism intervention, especially the neoconservative group that included Paul Wolfowitz. Around this time, he befriended the Iraqi dissident and businessman Ahmed Chalabi.
 
Hitchens argued the case for the Iraq War in a 2003 collection of essays entitled A Long Short War: The Postponed Liberation of Iraq, and participated in public debates on the topic with George Galloway, Scott Ritter, and his brother Peter Hitchens. In its obituary of Hitchens, The Economist wrote that, "on the most consequential political issue of the last decade of his life, the bullshit got him."

Human rights violations at Abu Ghraib and Haditha

Hitchens criticised human rights abuses by US forces in Iraq but argued that conditions had improved considerably compared either to Saddam Hussein's previous regime or to previous US military actions in Vietnam.

In 2005, Hitchens criticised the abuse of prisoners in Abu Ghraib but argued that overall "prison conditions at Abu Ghraib have improved markedly and dramatically since the arrival of Coalition troops in Baghdad", arguing that "before March 2003, Abu Ghraib was an abattoir, a torture chamber, and a concentration camp."

In a 5 June 2006 article on the alleged killings of Iraqi civilians by U.S. Marines in Haditha, Hitchens argued that whether or not a massacre had taken place, comparisons with the My Lai massacre in Vietnam were "so much propaganda and hot air" that ignored substantial changes in the rules of engagement and US Army procedures and training designed to prevent and discourage such an event. He argued that lesson had been learned such that "as a consequence, a training film about My Lai – "if anything like this happens, you have really, truly screwed up" – has been in use for U. S. soldiers for some time".

Pre-war American and British Intelligence
In a variety of articles and interviews, Hitchens asserted that British intelligence was correct in claiming that Saddam had attempted to buy uranium from Niger, and that US envoy Joseph Wilson had been dishonest in his public denials of it. He also pointed to discovered munitions in Iraq that violated U. N. Security Council Resolutions 686 and 687, the cease-fire agreements ending the 1991 Iraq-Kuwait conflict.

On 19 March 2007, Hitchens asked himself whether Western intelligence sources should have known that Iraq had 'no stockpiles of weapons of mass destruction.' In his response, Hitchens stated that:

Saddam Hussein
In July 2007, the New Statesman printed selected portions of a 1976 piece by Hitchens which they claimed "took a more admiring view of the Iraqi dictator" than his later strong support for ousting Saddam Hussein. In this Hitchens pointed to Iraq's military strength, oil reserves and young leadership to argue that Iraq was "a force to be reckoned with" and described Saddam Hussein as a leader "who has sprung from being an underground revolutionary gunman to perhaps the first visionary Arab statesman since Nasser." He also argued:

He argued that the means through which the Baathist regime rose to power were similar to that of Iran: having crushed any political dissent and notions of an independent Kurdish state. He stated that the Ba'ath party "point to efforts made by the party press to stimulate criticism of revolutionary shortcomings" but that these "fall rather short of permitting any organised opposition". He claimed that Iraq defended this by claiming "that the country is surrounded by enemies and attacked by imperialist intrigue" but that this had led to the repression of Kurdish nationalists.

Waterboarding
Hitchens was asked by Vanity Fair to experience waterboarding for himself at a U.S. Army training facility. In May 2008, Hitchens voluntarily underwent the procedure. Hitchens stopped the procedure after 11 seconds and subsequently endorsed the view that it was "torture." He concluded, "If waterboarding does not constitute torture, then there is no such thing as torture."

Lebanon
Hitchens described Lebanon as "the most plural society in the region" and criticized the Syrian regime for continuing to manipulate the country by proxies and by surrogates notably Hezbollah and the SSNP.

Hezbollah
In an article written on Slate, Hitchens stated:

Domestic policy

Civil liberties

Abortion

Hitchens stated, "[an] unborn child seems to me to be a real concept. It's not a growth or an appendix. You can't say the rights question doesn't come up. I don't think a woman should be forced to choose, or even can be", and, "as a materialist, I think it has been demonstrated that an embryo is a separate body and entity". Showing a desire to recognise the unborn as a life, he also affirmed a need for the right to abortion, stating, "the second-best fallback solution, which may sometimes be desirable for other reasons, is termination of pregnancy... all thinking people recognise a painful conflict of rights and interest in this question".

Hitchens opposed the overturning of Roe v. Wade and instead hoped for science to develop new solutions to unwanted pregnancies "that will make abortion more like a contraceptive procedure than a surgical one." He strongly criticized the encouragement of sexual abstinence within the anti-abortion movement of the Christian right, and the equating of contraceptives to abortion, as expressed by Mother Teresa and representatives of the Roman Catholic Church.

Capital punishment

Hitchens was a lifelong opponent of capital punishment. In a 2001 interview with Reason, Hitchens recalled that this was the very first issue on which he ever decided to take a stand in his youth. The reason for his opposition to capital punishment was that it gave too much power to the government. He later publicly opposed use of the death penalty for Saddam Hussein, an issue he discussed at length in his November 2006 essay "Don't Hang Saddam" for Slate.

Drug policy
Hitchens has called for the abolition of the "War on Drugs," which he described as an "authoritarian war" during a debate with William F. Buckley. Hitchens favored the legalization of cannabis for both recreational and medicinal purposes, and said, "Marijuana is a medicine. I have heard and read convincing arguments and had convincing testimony from real people who say that marijuana is a very useful medicine for the treatment of chemotherapy-induced nausea and for glaucoma. To keep that out of the reach of the sick, it seems to me, is sadistic".

Gun rights

Hithcens was described by The Atlantic as pro gun. Hitchens philosophically supported gun rights and was generally opposed to gun control. On the subject of the Second Amendment, Hitchens argued that as both an outright ban on guns and relying on a citizen militia for the national defence were equally idealistic and utopian, and that as gun control created a duopoly of force between the state and criminals, it would be more desirable to encourage training among average citizens so they might develop a better relationship with firearms.

Gender and sexuality

Hitchens was a supporter of LGBT rights. He opposed sodomy laws and supported same-sex marriage. He argued that the legalization of same-sex marriage was the "socialization of homosexuality" and "demonstrates the spread of conservatism" among the gay community.

Hitchens was a genital integrity activist, strongly criticizing the tradition of both male circumcision and female genital mutilation. In accordance with his antitheism, Hitchens described the tolerance of metzitzah b'peh (a Jewish tradition of sucking blood from the penis after the removal of the male foreskin) as "another disgusting religious practice".

Regulations 
Hitchens was known for his dislike of Nanny state policies put in place by New York city mayor Michael Bloomberg. On July 9, 2009, Hitchens wrote an article criticizing and mocking New York city regulations including smoking laws, bicycle laws, milk crate laws and other regulations. In the same article Hitchens claimed he had broken the laws he had criticized in the article.

NSA warrantless surveillance

In January 2006, Hitchens joined with four other individuals and four organisations, including the American Civil Liberties Union and Greenpeace, as plaintiffs in a lawsuit, ACLU v. NSA, challenging Bush's warrantless domestic spying program; the lawsuit was filed by the ACLU.

Voting rights

In March 2005, Hitchens supported further investigation into voting irregularities in Ohio during the 2004 presidential election.

Religion

At the New York Public Library in May 2007, Hitchens debated Al Sharpton on the issue of theism and anti-theism, giving rise to a memorable exchange about Mormonism in particular.

In God is Not Great, Hitchens contended that,

Hitchens was accused of "anti-Catholic bigotry" by others, including Brent Bozell and UCLA Law Professor Stephen Bainbridge. When Joe Scarborough on 12 March 2004 asked Hitchens whether he was "consumed with hatred for conservative Catholics", Hitchens responded that he was not and that he just thinks that "all religious belief is sinister and infantile".

In 2005, Hitchens praised Vladimir Lenin's creation of "secular Russia" and his destruction of the Russian Orthodox Church, describing it as "an absolute warren of backwardness and evil and superstition." In an interview with Radar in 2007, Hitchens said that if the Christian right's agenda were implemented in the United States "It wouldn't last very long and would, I hope, lead to civil war, which they will lose, but for which it would be a great pleasure to take part."

On 4 April 2009, Hitchens debated Christian philosopher William Lane Craig at Biola University on the topic "Does God Exist?" before both a live and closed circuit audience of over 15,000.

Islamism
Hitchens was deeply shocked by 14 February 1989 fatwa against his longtime friend Salman Rushdie. He became increasingly critical of what he called "theocratic fascism" or "fascism with an Islamic face": radical Islamists who supported the fatwa against Rushdie and sought the recreation of the medieval caliphate.

Hitchens is often credited with coining the term "Islamofascism", but Hitchens himself denied it, attributing its coinage to Malise Ruthven.

In February 2006, Hitchens helped organize a pro-Denmark rally outside the Danish Embassy in Washington, DC, in response to the Jyllands-Posten Muhammad cartoons controversy.

Hitchens has received criticism for his attacks on islam and has been referred to as Islamophobic. Hitchens has called Islamophobia "A stupid term—Islamophobia—has been put into circulation to try and suggest that a foul prejudice lurks behind any misgivings about Islam's infallible "message".

Mormonism
Hitchens was extremely critical of the doctrinal claims of Mormonism and opposed the candidacy of 2012 Republican presidential candidate Mitt Romney, a practicing Mormon.

References

Sources

External links
 

Political views
Political views by person